Akrofu is predominantly a farming community in the Ho Municipality of Volta Region, Ghana. It is noted for the production of rice, okro, cassava and garri.

Geography 
Akrofu is about 15 km from Ho, the Volta regional capital. It has Sokode to the south west, Klefe, Ziavi, and Hlefi to the south east, Wegbe Kpalime to the North West and Bame to the North East.

Akrofu is made up of two major communities; Xeviwofe and Agove with Xeviwofe being the seat of the Fiaga (Paramount Chief). There are other settler villages such as Dzebukope, Kpetorkope, etc. as part of Akrofu's traditional setup.

History 

The people of Akrofu migrated from Ìlé Ifẹ̀, a Yorùbá city in Nigeria with other Ewe groups, and later through Dahomey, Benin. This group finally  disintegrated in Notsie in the Republic of Togo. They were led from Notsie by their leaders Amega Blema, Xortor, and Xe. Amega Xe died when they got to the current settlement of the people of Akrofu. Few people were selected to stay on that land in memory of their late leader Amega Xe. The others moved on to form Saviefe, Sovie, and Alavanyo communities. These four communities are collectively called Sakomeawó, and they celebrate the Sasadu Festival.
After the death of Amega Xe, Kanuda Kodzo took over the mantle to establish the current Akrofu community.

External links 
 Official website

References 

 
 

Villages in Ghana
Populated places in the Volta Region